Blacktail may refer to a location in the United States:

Blacktail, North Dakota
Blacktail, South Dakota
Blacktail Butte, a mountain in Wyoming
Blacktail (video game), a 2022 video game.

See also
Black-tailed deer, the namesake animal of these places